Dirk Kontny (born 30 November 1965) is a German retired professional footballer who played as a midfielder.

References

External links
 

1965 births
Living people
German footballers
Association football midfielders
Bundesliga players
2. Bundesliga players
SG Wattenscheid 09 players
VfL Bochum players
SC Fortuna Köln players
Place of birth missing (living people)